Gabrielli is a surname originating in Italy. Due to Italian diaspora, it is also common in other countries such as the United States, Brazil, Argentina, Uruguay, Chile and France. The surname Gabrielli derives from the given name Gabriello (a variation of the common given name Gabriele) and it means "son of Gabriello".

A common surname variation is Gabrieli.

Notable people with the surname include:
 Gabrielli family: the Italian feudal family from Gubbio, a town in Umbria.
 Andrea Gabrieli (1532/1533-1585), Italian composer and organist
 Caterina Gabrielli (1730-1796), Italian soprano
 Cante dei Gabrielli (c. 1260 – c. 1335), Italian nobleman and condottiero
 Cecciolo Gabrielli (1375-1420), Italian nobleman
 Domenick L. Gabrielli (1912–1994), American lawyer, politician and judge
 Domenico Gabrielli (1651-1690), Italian composer and virtuoso violoncello player.
 Elisa Gabrielli (born 1988), American actress, voice artist, and comedian
 Francesco Gabrielli (1588–1636), Italian actor of the commedia dell'arte
 Franco Gabrielli (born 1960), Italian policeman
 Gabriele de' Gabrielli (1445–1511), Italian Roman Catholic bishop and cardinal
 Giovanni Gabrielli (died between 1603 and 1611), Italian actor of the commedia dell'arte
 Giovanni Maria Gabrielli (1654-1711), Italian Catholic cardinal
 Giulio Gabrielli (1604-1677), Italian Catholic cardinal
 Giulio Gabrielli (1748-1822), Italian Catholic cardinal
 Giovanni Gabrieli (c. 1554/1557–1612), Italian composer and organist
 Giuseppe Gabrielli (1903-1987), Italian aeronautics engineer
 Luigi Gabrielli (1790-1854), Italian soldier and military writer
 Nicolò Gabrielli (1814-1891), Italian opera composer
 Noemi Gabrielli (1901 – 1979), an Italian art historian, superintendent, and a museologist
 Pompeo Gabrielli (1780-1861), Italian general and politician
 Rodolfo Gabrielli (born 1951), Argentine governor and minister
 Tommaso Gabrielli (born 1992), Italian motorcycle racer 

Italian-language surnames
Surnames from given names